Moldova–Ukraine relations are the bilateral/diplomatic/foreign relations between the sovereign states of Moldova and Ukraine. The Moldova–Ukraine border is 985 kilometers (612 miles). Ukrainians are the second largest ethnic group in Moldova after ethnic Moldovans.  Both countries were former republics of the Soviet Union and are also the poorest countries in Europe.

History 
Ukraine, step by step after 2005, conceded several important economic privileges to Moldova. Kyiv accepted gas delivery to Moldova for the account of the Ukrainian share in the beginning of 2006 and electricity delivery at low tariffs. Ukraine has also accepted the introduction of the monitoring commission of the European Union at the Ukrainian-Moldovan border, as well as implementation of the unified customs procedure for the Transnistrian part of the Moldovan border. Ukraine opened its alcohol market for Moldovan production when Russia imposed a ban on it.

Nevertheless, certain areas remain with unsolved problems. Since 2006 Moldovan authorities have not delivered to Aerosvit the authorisation to operate daily flights to Chișinău. The rail transport remains an important issue, as Ukraine is constructing a new railway line to deviate from the problematic Transnistrian sector, with its frequent blocks of railway transportation. Moldova has not yet transferred to Ukraine the Odesa–Reni highway section, as well as bordering property in the region of Palanca.

Palanca is a marshy area that could become a Vennbahn-type enclave of Moldova surrounded by Ukraine.  Under a 2001 treaty between the two nations, Moldova is to transfer to Ukraine not only the asphalt (as it has already done), but also the real property under 7.7 kilometers (4¾ miles) of road (which is a portion of the 300 km; 200 mile road between Odesa and Reni), and to clarify the sovereignty of that land, which under that treaty is to be transferred to Ukraine.

The situation remains unresolved with one block of the Cuciurgan power station, as it considered to be on Moldovan territory today for unclear reasons, or at least contested by Ukraine. The construction of the oil terminal in Giurgiulesti is strongly contested by Ukraine for the ecological threat it represents to the Danubian region of Ukraine. Ukraine had transferred 400 meters (yards) of the Ukrainian bank of the Danube to Moldova in 1997, in order to make the construction of the terminal possible.

Moldovan–Ukrainian relations deteriorated under Moldovan President Igor Dodon due to his pro-Russian policies. This changed with the election of pro-European Maia Sandu in 2020.

State visits

 In July 2013, President of Moldova, Nicolae Timofti visited Ukrainian President Victor Yanukovych in Kyiv.
 In November 2014, President of Ukraine, Petro Poroshenko visited Chișinău and Bălți.
 After the start of 2022 Russian invasion of Ukraine, Moldovan President Maia Sandu visited Bucha and Irpin and met with President of Ukraine Volodymyr Zelenskiy on June 27, 2022.

Resident diplomatic mission
 Moldova has an embassy in Kyiv and a consulate-general in Odesa.
 Ukraine has an embassy in Chișinău and a consulate in Bălți.

See also 
 Moldova–Ukraine border
 Transnistria–Ukraine relations
 Foreign relations of Moldova
 Foreign relations of Ukraine
 Embassy of Ukraine in Moldova
 Moldova in the Eurovision Song Contest 2015

References

External links 
 Embassy of Republic of Moldova in Kyiv
 Ukrainian embassy in Chisinau 
 Ministers of Foreign Affairs of the Republic of Moldova
 Ukrainian Ministry of Foreign Affairs 

 
Ukraine
Bilateral relations of Ukraine